Georgiana Bruce Kirby (7 December 1818 - 27 January 1887) was an American public school teacher and governess noted for her work in women's suffrage in the late 19th century. She is the founder of the Santa Cruz Society of Suffragists.

Life and career
Kirby was born on December 7, 1818, in Bristol, England. Her father died three months before her birth while working as a merchant seaman out at sea. As a result of financial rearrangements relating to her mother's remarriage, Kirby only spent two years in formal schooling before leaving her small town to hold various positions in other families' homes. She became a governess at the age of fourteen to an English family who took her to Paris and then Melbourne, Canada where she is known for being a school teacher. She taught her students farming fundamentals before returning to London in 1837. Working for the American Unitarian minister Ezra Stiles Gannett eventually brought her to Boston at the age of twenty.

There, Kirby joined the Transcendentalist community of Brook Farm at West Roxbury, Massachusetts, alongside her brother. The community’s liberal religious beliefs forced all members to live in a community, cooperative living. Bruce studied at the school, ran the nursery, and participated in academic discussions about various Brook Farm literary members and visitors, including Ralph Waldo Emerson, William Henry Channing, and Margaret Fuller. These authors and the spirit of transcendentalism had a major influence on Bruce’s writing during this period. At Brook Farm, she joined the “Fancy Group”, which allowed women to use domestic skills to paint lampshades and screens which were sold to raise money to help fund the community.

By February 1844, Kirby had supported Brook Farm’s conversion to the French utopian social doctrines of Charles Fourier. However, her opinion that the community had lost its spontaneity resulted in a move to New York City. There, Bruce networked with her friend Margaret Fuller, and landed a job as an assistant to Eliza Farnham, newly-appointed matron of the Sing Sing Correctional Facility in New York. After working at Sing Sing for a year, Bruce left New York to teach at schools in Illinois and Missouri but soon returned east to serve as a public school teacher and governess in Pennsylvania and New York.

With funds borrowed from Horace Greeley, Bruce traveled West in 1850 to join Farnham in Santa Cruz, California 1850 where Farnham's late husband Thomas J. Farnham had been given a piece of land by Isaac Graham. Eliza Farnham had been ridiculed in Boston for her plan to bring a large group of single women to California, and eventually decided to travel alone to the West. Georgiana helped Eliza work the farm for two years, producing poultry, potatoes, and fruit. While in California, Bruce continued her involvement in furthering women’s rights, the Temperance movement, and the anti-slavery movement.

In 1852, Bruce married Richard Kirby, a local tanner, and had five children. She continued to write fiction and short stories. Reform papers such as Greeley’s New York Tribune and National Anti-Slavery Standard were instrumental in keeping her in touch with past activist connections. She kept a journal from 1852 to 1860. The abolitionist movement and the Civil War fuelled Bruce’s belief that women were enslaved, and after the Civil War, she joined the women’s rights movement to secure women’s rights in the Fourteenth and Fifteenth Amendments. By 1869, she raised enough money to fund California’s first local woman's suffrage society. In 1870, she served as vice-president of the San Francisco Women’s Rights Convention. Bruce reported on local lectures by Susan B. Anthony and Elizabeth Cady Stanton in the Santa Cruz Sentinel. She also criticized California’s judge's decision that prevented women from voting and debated woman suffrage critics. In 1874, at the age of 56, she organized the Santa Cruz Temperance Union, which became affiliated with the WCTU, Women’s Christian Temperance Union, that successfully encouraged the prohibition movement later in the 1920s.

Death
Georgiana Bruce Kirby died at the age of 68 on January 27, 1887. In the same year, her memoir up to 1850 was published, Years of Experience: An Autobiographical Narrative, alongside her diary. 

Georgiana Bruce Kirby Preparatory School, in Santa Cruz, California, was named after her, and supports her ideals.

Notes

References
 
 
 

1818 births
1887 deaths
English emigrants to the United States
English expatriates in Canada
Schoolteachers from Massachusetts
19th-century American women educators
English expatriates in France
American diarists
American governesses
Women diarists
19th-century American short story writers
19th-century American women writers
American women short story writers
19th-century American educators
19th-century diarists